The 2014 New Zealand Music Awards was the 49th holding of the annual ceremony featuring awards for musical recording artists based in or originating from New Zealand. It took place on 20 November 2014 at Vector Arena in Auckland. The awards show was screened on channel Four, the first time the event was broadcast live.

The technical award winners, legacy award recipient and the Critics' Choice Prize shortlist were announced on 16 October at the Pullman hotel, Auckland. The Critics Choice showcase and award presentation were held on 29 October at the King's Arms in Auckland.

The awards were dominated by Lorde, who won six awards, including Album of the Year, Single of the Year, Best Female Solo Artist, Best Pop Album, Highest Selling Single and the International Achievement Award.

Early awards 
While most of the awards were presented at the main awards ceremony held in November, five genre awards were presented earlier at ceremonies of their field. The first was awarded in January, with the Tui for Best Folk Album presented at the Auckland Folk Festival in Kumeu to Auckland duo Tattletale Saints for their album How Red Is the Blood. The Tui for Best Jazz Album was presented in March to Nathan Haines at the National Jazz Festival in Tauranga for his album Vermillion Skies. This was Haines' third Tui for Best Jazz Album, after previously winning in 2013 and 1996. The Tui for Best Pacific Music Album was presented in May to operatic pop trio Sol3 Mio for their self-titled album. The Best Country Music Album Tui was presented in May at the New Zealand Country Music Awards in Gore to Kaylee Bell for her album Heart First. In July the Best Children's Music Album award was presented live on What Now to Anika Moa for her album Songs For Bubbas.

Nominees and winners
Winners are listed first and highlighted in boldface.
Key
 – Technical award

Presenters and performers

Presenters
Presenters of awards:
Shannon Ryan and Dai Henwood – Highest Selling Single, Highest Selling Album and Airplay Record of the Year
Sweet Mix Kids – Best Electronica Album
Natalia Kills and Willy Moon – Best Urban/Hip Hop Album and Best Pop Album
Lizzie Marvelly – Best Classical Album
Jono Pryor and Ben Boyce – Best Group and Best Rock Album
Brooke Duff – Best Gospel/Christian Album
Guy Williams and Rose Matafeo – Best Male Solo Artist and Best Female Solo Artist
Maisey Rika – Best Māori Album
 Damian Vaughn – International Achievement Award
Hollie Smith – Best Roots Album
Jeremy Corbett and Paul Ego – Best Alternative Album
Jamie McDell – Best Music Video
Maria Tutaia – Breakthrough Artist of the Year
Slave & Otis – Legacy Award
James Rolleston – People's Choice Award
Jon Toogood – Single of the Year and Album of the Year

Performers
Performers at the ceremony:
David Dallas – "Runnin'"
Benny Tipene – "Make You Mine"
Sol3 Mio – "’O sole mio"
Tiny Ruins – "Me at the Museum, You in the Wintergardens"
Blacklistt – "Burn"
Broods – "Bridges"
Super-Sista-Groove featuring Hollie Smith, MC Tali, Iva Lamkum, Ria Hall and The Levites – "Can't Get Enough"

References

External links
Official New Zealand Music Awards website

New Zealand Music Awards, 2014
Music Awards, 2014
Aotearoa Music Awards
November 2014 events in New Zealand